Phoonk (English:Blow) is a 2008 Indian supernatural horror film directed by Ram Gopal Varma and produced by Praveen Nischol. The film stars Sudeep, Amruta Khanvilkar, and Ahsaas Channa in the lead roles, while Kenny Desai, Ashwini Kalsekar, and Zakir Hussain play supporting roles. The film is based on superstition and black magic. The film released on 22 August 2008 and was declared a blockbuster at the box office by several media outlets.

Varma derived the idea for the film from a Hindi news channel which telecasts stories on black magic. The storyline of Phoonk is thematically similar to the Telugu thriller novel Tulasi Dalam by Yandamuri Veerendranath.

The film was remade in Telugu as Raksha and was dubbed in Tamil as Bommayi. It was followed by a sequel, Phoonk 2, in 2010.

Plot

Civil engineer and atheist Rajiv lives in Mumbai with his wife Aarti, his two children Raksha and Rohan, his mother, and the housemaid Laxmi. Rajiv's most trusted colleagues are Anshuman and Madhu, whom everyone, including Rajiv's friend Vinay and Raksha, feels are not normal. During a party at his house, when he learns that the married couple have cheated him on a valuable contract for an IT firm in Delhi, Rajiv fires both of them after insulting them both. Humiliated and angry at this, they both seek vengeance on Rajiv. Madhu notes that Rajiv is fond of Raksha.

Soon, a series of strange events start to take place in and around Rajiv's house. Mandar, who is appointed to take the place of Madhu and Anshuman, is mysteriously killed at the construction site. Raksha starts to talk and behave weirdly, much to everyone's shock. Doctors are called for, but the strange behavior continues, with Raksha flying in the air, talking in a manly voice, acting in pain. The superstitious and religious grandmother repeatedly says that someone is using black magic on Raksha, but Rajiv and the doctors refuse to believe any of it.

Now at the end of his wits, Rajiv begins to look to God. He also agrees to his construction laborers' demand of making a small shrine at the construction site, which he previously opposed. Vinay suggests asking for the help of Manja, a magician familiar with these things.

Manja analyzes the whole situation, sees Raksha, visits Rajiv's house, and tells the latter that someone is trying to take revenge on him, at which Vinay exclaims that it is none other than Madhu and Anshuman. Manja also tells them that Rajiv's driver has been helping the duo by providing them with necessary materials like Raksha's hair, soil from her foot, and her toys to perform black magic.

Losing no more time, Rajiv, Vinay, and Manja rush to Madhu's house, where she and Anshuman are found to be doing black magic rituals on a doll, supposedly an effigy of Raksha. Rajiv orders Madhu to cease, but she attacks him with a trishul. Vinay takes on Anshuman. The effect of the black magic forces seep on the entire place, pushing everyone away. As Madhu is going to attack Rajiv who is being pushed towards the wall, Manja uses his powers to separate the running ceiling fan, which lands on Madhu's head, humorously decapitating her. All the negative forces stop, and a spider comes out of one of the skulls on the floor and bites the driver, who dies.

Everyone rushes to the hospital to find that Raksha has completely recovered. Rajiv and Vinay see that everyone thinks it is the doctors who have cured Raksha, and they smile at each other.

Cast

Sudeep as Rajiv (voiceover by Rajesh Khattar)
Amruta Khanvilkar as Aarti
Ahsaas Channa as Raksha
Kenny Desai as Anshuman
Ashwini Kalsekar as Madhu
Ganesh Yadav as Vinay Sonti
Zakir Hussain as Manja
Shrey Bawa as Rohan
Anu Ansari as Laxmi
Javed Rizvi as Rajiv's driver
Shankar Sachdev as Shyam
K. K. Raina as Dr. Pandey
Lilette Dubey as Dr. Seema Walke
Bharat Kaul as Mandar
Jyoti Subhash as Amma
Geetanjali as Teacher
Kishore Kadam as Devappa
Dhiraj Regmi as Mani

Reception

Box office

Ram Gopal Varma's Phoonk turned out to be a success at the box office. The movie opened after an effective publicity campaign. which, combined with its success at the box office, turned a good profit for its investors. It was very popular, especially among younger viewers, for the creator's Rs. 5 Lakh challenge.

Critical response
Critically, the movie received mixed reviews. Taran Adarsh gave it 4 out of 5 and said, "Phoonk is a fascinating cinematic experience on a subject that’s rarely tackled by the dream merchants in Bollywood: Black magic." AOL India reviewer Noyon Jyoti Parasara gave a negative review of the film saying, "Overall Phoonk scores low on the scare-o-meter."

Sequel
A sequel, Phoonk 2, released on 16 April 2010, to mixed reviews and a lacklustre commercial reception, failing to repeat the success of the original.

Accolades

Stardust Awards
(Jury's Choice) – Hottest New Film – Nominated  
(Jury's Choice) – Exciting New Face – Nominated – Amruta Khanvilkar

Screen Awards
Screen Award for Best Villain – Nominated – Ashwini Kalsekar
Screen Award for Best Background Music – Nominated – Bapi-Tutul

References

Indian horror films
2008 horror films
2000s Hindi-language films
Films directed by Ram Gopal Varma
2008 films
Films based on Indian novels
Hindi films remade in other languages
Hindi-language horror films